The New World porcupines, family Erethizontidae, are large arboreal rodents, distinguished by their spiny coverings from which they take their name. They inhabit forests and wooded regions across North America, and into northern South America. Although both the New World and Old World porcupine families belong to the Hystricognathi branch of the vast order Rodentia, they are quite different and are not closely related.

Characteristics 
New World porcupines are stout animals, with blunt, rounded heads, fleshy, mobile snouts, and coats of thick, cylindrical or flattened spines. The "quills" are mixed with long, soft hairs.

They are distinguished from the Old World porcupines in that they have rooted molars, complete collar bones, entire upper lips, tuberculated soles, no trace of first front toes, and four teats.

They are less strictly nocturnal than Old World species in their habits, and some types live entirely in trees, while others have dens on the ground. Their long and powerful prehensile tails help them balance when they are in the tree tops. Their diets consist mainly of bark, leaves, and conifer needles, but can also include roots, stems, berries, fruits, seeds, nuts, grasses, and flowers. Some species also eat insects and small reptiles. Their teeth are similar to those of Old World porcupines, with the dental formula 

Solitary offspring (or, rarely, twins) are born after a gestation period of up to 210 days, depending on the species. The young are born fully developed, with open eyes, and are able to climb trees within a few days of birth.

Genera and species 
They include three genera, of which the first is represented by the North American porcupine (Erethizon dorsatum), a stout, heavily built animal, with long hairs almost or quite hiding its spines, four front and five hind toes, and a short, stumpy tail. It is a native of the greater part of Canada and the United States, where any remnant of the original forest is left.

The tree porcupines (Coendou) contain 17 species. They are found throughout tropical South America, with two extending into Mexico. They are of a lighter build than the ground porcupines, with short, close, many-coloured spines, often mixed with hairs, and prehensile tails. The hind feet have only four toes, owing to the suppression of the first, in place of which they have a fleshy pad on the inner side of the foot; between this pad and the toes, branches and other objects can be firmly grasped as with a hand. These three genera are often united into a single genus Coendou.

Genus Chaetomys, distinguished by the shape of its skull and the greater complexity of its teeth, contains C. subspinosus, a native of the hottest parts of Brazil. This animal is often considered a member of Echimyidae on the basis of its premolars. However, a molecular phylogeny based on the mitochondrial gene coding for cytochrome b combined to karyological evidence actually suggests the bristle-spined rat is more closely related to the Erethizontidae than to the Echimyidae, and is the sister group of all other Erethizontidae.

Classification 

Extant genera and species
 Family Erethizontidae
 Subfamily Chaetomyinae
 Genus Chaetomys
 Bristle-spined rat C. subspinosus
 Subfamily Erethizontinae
 Genus Coendou – prehensile-tailed porcupines
 Baturite porcupine - C. baturitensis - discovered in 2013
 Bicolored-spined porcupine - C. bicolor
 Streaked dwarf porcupine - C. ichillus
 Bahia porcupine - C. insidiosus
 Black-tailed hairy dwarf porcupine - C. melanurus
 Mexican hairy dwarf porcupine - C. mexicanus
 Black dwarf porcupine - C. nycthemera
 Brazilian porcupine - C. prehensilis
 Frosted hairy dwarf porcupine - C. pruinosus
 Andean porcupine - C. quichua
 Rothschild's porcupine - C. rothschildi
 Roosmalen's dwarf porcupine - C. roosmalenorum
 Stump-tailed porcupine - C. rufescens
 Santa Marta porcupine - C. sanctamartae
 Coandumirim - C. speratus - discovered in 2013
 Paraguaian hairy dwarf porcupine - C. spinosus
 Brown hairy dwarf porcupine - C. vestitus 
 Genus Erethizon
 North American porcupine - E. dorsatum

Fossil genera
 †Branisamyopsis 
 †Cholamys 
 †Eopululo 
 †Hypsosteiromys 
 †Microsteiromys 
 †Neosteiromys 
 †Palaeosteiromys 
 †Paradoxomys 
 †Parasteiromys 
 †Protosteiromys

References

External links 

 Erethizontidae, Mammal Species of the World, 3rd edition.

 
Extant Chattian first appearances
Mammals described in 1845
Taxa named by Charles Lucien Bonaparte